Dorothea of Caesarea (Dorothea, Dora; often just called Saint Dorothy, died ca. 311 AD) is a 4th-century virgin martyr who was executed at Caesarea Mazaca. Evidence for her actual historical existence or acta is very sparse. She is called a martyr of the late Diocletianic Persecution, although her death occurred after the resignation of Diocletian himself. 

Dorothea and her companion, Theophilus, are mentioned in the Roman Martyrology as martyrs of Caesarea in Cappadocia, with a feast on 6 February. She is officially recognized as a virgin martyr.  However, since only those feast of saints should be extended to the universal church which commemorate saints who are truly of universal significance, her feast is no longer included in the General Roman Calendar, but in some regional calendars.

Life

The earliest record that mentions Dorothea is found in the Martyrologium Hieronymianum. This first record contains only three basic facts: the day of martyrdom, the place where it occurred, and her name and that of Theophilus.

Legend
Virgin and martyr, Dorothea of Caesarea was persecuted during the persecution of Diocletian, 6 February, 311, at Caesarea in Cappadocia. She was brought before the prefect Sapricius, tried, tortured, and sentenced to death. On her way to the place of execution the pagan lawyer Theophilus said to her in mockery: "Bride of Christ, send me some fruits from your bridegroom's garden." Before she was executed, she sent him, by a six-year-old boy, her headdress which was found to be filled with a heavenly fragrance of roses and fruits. Theophilus at once confessed himself a Christian, was put on the rack, and suffered death. This is the oldest version of the legend, which was later variously enlarged (The boy with the basket can be seen in the depictions by Josse van der Baren and Hans Baldung Grien in the gallery below). 

The oldest known version of the legend is Aldhelm's De laudibus virginitatis, addressed to Abbess Hildelitha of Barking Abbey, Essex. Kirsten Wolf characterizes it as one of several legends invented in the fourth and fifth centuries to provide a story to go with a name on one of the various liturgical calendars.

Veneration
In the Western church Dorothy of Caesarea has been venerated since the seventh century. Since the fourteenth century many artists created paintings and sculptures, which are to be found throughout Europe. In late medieval Sweden Saint Dorothy was considered to be the 15th of the Holy Helpers, and in arts she occurred with Saints Barbara, Catherine and Margaret, forming with them a quartet of female virgin martyrs called Quattuor Virgines Capitales, meaning "The four Capital Virgins".

Dorothy of Caesarea is regarded as the patroness of gardeners, due to her virginal attribute of a wreath of roses.

On her feast on 6 February trees are blessed. Saint Dorothy is also patroness of brewers, brides, florists, midwives, newlyweds and of the village of Pescia in Italy.

The Sisters of St. Dorothy is a congregation of sisters, occupied primarily with teaching.

Dorothy of Caesarea's life and martyrdom was the basis of Philip Massinger and Thomas Dekker's The Virgin Martyr (printed 1622).

Iconography
Saint Dorothy is often depicted as a virgin carrying a basket of flowers, sometimes with fruit, and also wearing a crown of roses; she has also been depicted as being: surrounded by stars as she kneels before the executioner; crowned with palm, referring to the martyr's palm; in an enclosed garden or an orchard with the Christ Child in an apple tree; leading the Christ Child by the hand; veiled with flowers in her lap; and holding apples from heaven on a branch.

Depictions

See also
 Sainte-Dorothée, Quebec, a borough in Laval, Quebec, Canada

Notes

References
Butler, Alban. The Lives of the Saints. Rockford, Illinois: Tan Books and Publishers, 1995. (Originally published 1878.) Nihil obstat and Imprimatur 1955.
Englebert, Omer. The Lives of the Saints. Christopher and Anne Fremantle, trans. New York: Barnes & Noble Books, 1994. Nihil obstat and Imprimatur 1951.
Harvey, Sir Paul, ed. The Oxford Companion to English Literature. 4th ed. New York: Oxford University Press, 1967.
Peterson, Joseph Martin, The Dorothea Legend: Its Earliest Records, Middle English Versions, and Influence of Massinger’s "Virgin Martyr" (University of Heidelberg, 1910).
The Swedish Nationalecyklopedin Volume 5 p. 102
Medeltidens ABC edited by The Swedish national museum of history p. 93, 276.

External links
 Santa Dorotea e Teofilo Martire di Cesarea di Cappadocia
Representetions of Saint Dorothea of Caesarea
Saint Dorothy at the Christian Iconography web site
Here Followeth the Life of St. Dorothy in Caxton's translation of the Golden Legend

311 deaths
Saints from Roman Anatolia
4th-century Christian martyrs
Virgin martyrs
4th-century Roman women
4th-century Christian saints
279 births
Late Ancient Christian female saints
People whose existence is disputed
Christians martyred during the reign of Diocletian